High Prairie Airport  is located  south of High Prairie, Alberta, Canada.

References

External links

Place to Fly on COPA's Places to Fly airport directory

Registered aerodromes in Alberta
Big Lakes County